Sam Cavanagh is an Australian radio producer.

Cavanagh is currently the executive producer of The Hamish & Andy Show.

Career

Cavanagh and Hamish Blake have been friends since age 15.

Personal life
Cavanagh and partner Katie "Monty" Dimond are parents to three children.

Awards
 2007: Best Show Producer, Australian Commercial Radio Awards
2008: Best Show Producer, Australian Commercial Radio Awards
 2009: Best Show Producer, Australian Commercial Radio Awards

References

External links
Meet Hamish & Andy's producer

Year of birth missing (living people)
Living people
Hamish & Andy
Australian radio producers